The 2020 Campeonato Brasileiro Série B was a football competition held in Brazil, equivalent to the second division. The competition was originally scheduled to begin on 2 May and end on 28 November, however due to the COVID-19 pandemic the tournament was rescheduled for 7 August 2020–29 January 2021.

Twenty teams competed in the tournament, twelve returning from the 2019 season, four promoted from the 2019 Campeonato Brasileiro Série C (Confiança, Juventude, Náutico and Sampaio Corrêa), and four relegated from the 2019 Campeonato Brasileiro Série A (Avaí, Chapecoense, Cruzeiro and CSA). This was the first Série B played by Cruzeiro in their history.

Cruzeiro were deducted six points after their denial to pay the fee that was agreed upon with Emirati side Al Wahda over Denílson loan in 2016. Al Wahda decided to take this issue to FIFA and they won the case.

The matches Chapecoense v CSA, scheduled for 12 August 2020 (2nd round), CSA v Cuiabá, scheduled for 15 August 2020 (3rd round), Sampaio Corrêa v Figueirense, scheduled for 19 August 2020 (4th round), and Brasil de Pelotas v Sampaio Corrêa, scheduled for 23 August 2020 (5th round), were postponed after 20 CSA and 14 Sampaio Corrêa players tested positive for COVID-19.

The top four teams were promoted to the 2021 Campeonato Brasileiro Série A. América Mineiro and Chapecoense became the first two clubs to be promoted on 12 January 2021 after a 0–0 draw against Náutico and a 2–1 win against Figueirense, respectively. Cuiabá was promoted on 22 January 2021, and Juventude on 29 January 2021.

Teams

Number of teams by state

Venues

Personnel and kits

Managerial changes

Foreign players
The clubs could have a maximum of five foreign players in their Campeonato Brasileiro squads per match, but there was no limit of foreigners in the clubs' squads.

(dn) = Player holding Brazilian dual nationality.

League table

Positions by round
The table lists the positions of teams after each week of matches. In order to preserve chronological evolvements, any postponed matches are not included to the round at which they were originally scheduled, but added to the full round they were played immediately afterwards.

Results

Top goalscorers

Awards

References

Campeonato Brasileiro Série B seasons
2
Campeonato Brasileiro Série B